The siege of Khiva was an operation between 19 and 24 January 1924 by Basmachi insurgents to conquer the city of Khiva from the Red Army.

Prelude 
While the Russian Civil War had been decided in favor of the Red Army on all other fronts, the situation in Central Asia remained volatile because of the ongoing Basmachi rebellion.
By January 1924, the situation in the Khorezm People's Soviet Republic (former Khanate of Khiva) became much more complicated. Junaid Khan was also reinforced with some 6,000 local Kurbashi horsemen.

After deciding to begin a new campaign against the Bolsheviks, the Basmachis came out of the desert, captured several kishlaks and, under the leadership of the former Khiva khanate minister Sadiq Bakalov and Turkmen leader Agadzhi Ishan, organized uprisings in Sadivar, Pitnak and Hazorasp and took Xonqa.

The siege 
On 19 January 1924, the Basmachi force arrived at Khiva and laid siege. The garrison of the city of only 290 soldiers successfully repelled attempts at assault. For the defense of the city, companies of workers and Komsomol detachments were formed, which numbered around 500 people.

During the fighting, the commander of the garrison, a Hungarian called Angello, was seriously wounded and captured by the Basmachis. Having tortured him, the Basmachis then cut off his head, which they impaled on a stake and put on display for those who defended the fortress. 
During the defense of Khiva, around 200 Red Armymen were killed or seriously wounded.

After some 4 days, a relief force of the Red Army began to advance towards Khiva. In the area of Pitnak, serious battles broke out with the Basmachis of Turkmen leader Agadzhi Ishan, which lasted about two days. The Basmachis were crushed. The Turtkul Cavalry Squadron, under the command of political commisar Surinov, managed to bypass the outposts of the Basmachis, and reach Khiva, inflicting a heavy defeat upon the Basmachis and forcing them to abandon the siege.

Consequences 
Further developing the offensive, the units of the Red Army were able to virtually destroy the Basmach forces.
  
On the 8 April, Junaid Khan was forced to retreat across the Persian border with the remnants of his troops.

Sources 
 History of Khiva - Part 13 Revolt of the nomadic tribes of Turkmen led by Djunaid Khan

References

Basmachi movement
Soviet Central Asia
1924 in the Soviet Union
Russian Civil War
Wars involving Uzbekistan
20th-century rebellions
Conflicts in 1924